Lycurus is a small genus of New World plants in the grass family, native to North and South America.

These grasses are known commonly as wolfstails.

 Species
 Lycurus phalaroides Kunth - Mexico, Guatemala, Colombia, Ecuador, Peru, Bolivia, northwestern Argentina
 Lycurus phleoides Kunth - southwestern + south-central USA (AZ UT CO NM TX OK), northern + central Mexico, Bolivia, Peru
 Lycurus setosus (Nutt.) C.Reeder - southwestern + south-central USA (CA NV AZ UT CO NM TX OK KS), Mexico (Baja California, Sonora, Chihuahua, Durango, Coahuila, San Luis Potosí), northern Argentina

References

Chloridoideae
Poaceae genera